Charles Voysey may refer to:

 Charles Voysey (theist) (1828–1912), English Anglican priest
 C. F. A. Voysey (Charles Francis Annesley Voysey, 1857–1941), English architect and furniture and textile designer
 Charles Cowles-Voysey (1889–1981), architect and son of the above